Mycena pseudostylobates is a species of agaric fungus in the family Mycenaceae. It is bioluminescent.

See also
List of bioluminescent fungi

References

pseudostylobates
Bioluminescent fungi
Fungi described in 1951
Fungi of Asia